Martín Rodrigo Anselmi (born 11 July 1985) is an Argentine football manager, currently in charge of Ecuadorian club Independiente del Valle.

Career
Anselmi began his career with Excursionistas' youth setup in 2015, and had a brief stint at CAI before being invited by Gabriel Milito to join his staff at Independiente in 2016. 

In 2017, Anselmi joined Atlanta as Francisco Berscé's assistant. In the following year, he moved abroad and was named in charge of Ecuadorian side Universidad Católica del Ecuador's reserve team.

In 2019, after a short period at Real Garcilaso, Anselmi returned to Ecuador and became Miguel Ángel Ramírez's assistant at Independiente del Valle. He followed Ramírez to Internacional, but left the club on 11 June when the manager was dismissed.

On 17 December 2021, Anselmi was named manager of Chilean Primera División side Unión La Calera for the ensuing campaign. The following 25 April, with only one win in 11 league matches, he left the club on a mutual agreement.

On 30 May 2022, Anselmi returned to del Valle, now replacing Renato Paiva as manager.

Honours
Independiente del Valle
Copa Sudamericana: 2022
Copa Ecuador: 2022
Supercopa Ecuador: 2023
Recopa Sudamericana: 2023

References

External links

1985 births
Living people
Argentine football managers
Unión La Calera managers
C.S.D. Independiente del Valle managers
Chilean Primera División managers
Argentine expatriate football managers
Argentine expatriate sportspeople in Ecuador
Argentine expatriate sportspeople in Peru
Argentine expatriate sportspeople in Brazil
Expatriate football managers in Ecuador
Expatriate football managers in Brazil
Argentine expatriate sportspeople in Chile
Expatriate football managers in Chile